Utah (SSN-801), a , is the second U.S. Navy vessel named for the state of Utah. Secretary of the Navy Ray Mabus announced the name on September 28, 2015, at a ceremony in Salt Lake City, Utah. The Navy specifically selected boat number "801" to be named Utah, even jumping over some other as-yet-unnamed boats, as 801 is the telephone area code for Utah's capital, Salt Lake City.

The keel laying ceremony took place 1 September 2021 at the Groton Facility of General Dynamics Electric Boat in Groton, Connecticut. The ships sponsor is Kate Mabus, daughter of Former Secretary of the Navy, Ray Mabus.

References

 

Virginia-class submarines
Submarines of the United States Navy